is a passenger railway station in located in the town of Kihō, Minamimuro District, Mie, Japan, operated by Central Japan Railway Company (JR Tōkai).

Lines

Station layout
The station consists of a single side platform serving bidirectional traffic. The original station building, dating from the opening of the line, was demolished and replaced by a smaller, simpler waiting-room structure in 2015–16. The station is unattended.

Platforms

History 
Kii-Ichigi Station opened on 8 August 1940 as a station on the Japanese Government Railways (JGR) Kisei-Nishi Line. The JGR became the Japan National Railways (JNR) after World War II, and the line was renamed the Kisei Main Line on 15 July 1959.  The station has been unattended since 21 December 1983. The station was absorbed into the JR Central network upon the privatization of the JNR on 1 April 1987.

Passenger statistics
In fiscal 2019, the station was used by an average of 43 passengers daily (boarding passengers only).

Surrounding area
Mihama Municipal Mihama Elementary School

See also
List of railway stations in Japan

References

External links

  JR Central timetable 

Railway stations in Japan opened in 1940
Mihama, Mie
Railway stations in Mie Prefecture